Linda H. Short was a Democratic member of the South Carolina Senate, representing the 17th District from 1992 to 2008.

External links
South Carolina Legislature - Senator Linda H. Short official SC Senate website
Project Vote Smart - Senator Linda H. Short (SC) profile
Follow the Money - Linda H. Short
2006 2004 2002 2000 1996 campaign contributions

South Carolina state senators
1947 births
Living people
Women state legislators in South Carolina
People from Gastonia, North Carolina
21st-century American women

Women in the South Carolina State Senate